Heliophanus iranus is a jumping spider species in the genus Heliophanus.  It was first described by Wanda Wesołowska in 1986 and lives in Iran.

References

Spiders described in 1986
Fauna of Iran
Salticidae
Spiders of Asia
Taxa named by Wanda Wesołowska